The Russell Senate Office Building is the oldest of the United States Senate office buildings. Designed in the Beaux-Arts architectural style, it was built from 1903 to 1908 and opened in 1909. It was named for former Senator Richard Russell Jr. from Georgia in 1972. It occupies a site north of the Capitol bounded by Constitution Avenue, First Street, Delaware Avenue, and C Street N.E.

History
The first congressional office building was constructed immediately after the turn of the 20th century to relieve overcrowding in the United States Capitol. Previously, members who wanted office space had to rent quarters or borrow space in committee rooms. In March 1901 Congress authorized Architect of the Capitol Edward Clark to draw plans for fireproof office buildings adjacent to the Capitol grounds. In March 1903 the acquisition of sites and construction of the buildings were authorized, and the Senate Office Building Commission selected a site.

In April 1904, the prominent New York City architectural firm of Carrère and Hastings was retained. John Carrère took charge of the Senate Office Building project, while Thomas Hastings oversaw the construction of an almost identical office building (now named the Cannon House Office Building) for the United States House of Representatives. Their Beaux Arts designs were restrained complements to the Capitol. Architecturally, their elevations are divided into a rusticated base and a colonnade with an entablature and balustrade. The Constitution Ave. side is a quasi replica of the easternmost façade of the Palais du Louvre in Paris. The colonnades, with 34 Doric columns that face the Capitol, are echoed by pilasters on the sides of the buildings. Both buildings are faced with marble and limestone; the Russell Building's base and terrace are gray granite. Modern for their time, they included such facilities as forced-air ventilation systems, steam heat, individual lavatories with hot and cold running water and ice water, telephones, and electricity. Both are connected to the Capitol by underground passages. Originally there were 98 suites and eight committee rooms in the Russell Building; the First Street Wing, completed in 1933, added two committee rooms and 28 suites.

Of special architectural interest is the rotunda. Eighteen Corinthian columns support an entablature and a coffered dome, whose glazed oculus floods the rotunda with sunlight. Twin marble staircases lead from the rotunda to an imposing Caucus Room, which features Corinthian pilasters, a full entablature, and a richly detailed ceiling; the Russell Caucus Room (known since 2009 as the "Kennedy Caucus Room" in honor of Senators John F. Kennedy, Robert F. Kennedy, and Edward M. Kennedy) retains its original 1910 benches and settles with carved eagles. This space has been used for many hearings on subjects of national significance, including the 1912 sinking of the RMS Titanic hearings; the 1974 Watergate hearings, the Iran-Contra hearings, and the 1991 Clarence Thomas Supreme Court nomination hearings. The rotunda contains a statue of Russell by sculptor Frederick Hart.

The Russell Building was occupied in 1909 by the Senate of the 61st Congress. The growth of staff and committees in the twenty years following its completion resulted in the addition of a fourth side, the First Street Wing, to the originally U-shaped building. Nathan C. Wyeth and Francis P. Sullivan were the consulting architects for the new wing, which was completed in 1933. The building was originally named the Senate Office Building. When the Dirksen Office Building was completed, it became the New Senate Office Building and the original Senate Office Building became the "Old Senate Office Building" until being renamed the Russell Building in 1972.

The building received extensive pop culture visual cachet in the 1970s when film footage of the southwest corner was regularly used to represent the headquarters of the fictional OSI organization in the TV series The Six Million Dollar Man and The Bionic Woman.

Chuck Schumer, the then-Senate Minority Leader announced on August 25, 2018, that he would introduce a resolution to rename the building after Senator John McCain from Arizona, who died of brain cancer earlier that day.

Senators with Russell offices

Committee offices within Russell Senate Office Building
United States Senate Committee on Agriculture, Nutrition and Forestry
United States Senate Committee on Armed Services
United States Senate Committee on Rules and Administration
United States Senate Committee on Small Business and Entrepreneurship
United States Senate Committee on Veterans' Affairs
United States Senate Homeland Security Permanent Subcommittee on Investigations

Gallery

See also
Hart Senate Office Building
Dirksen Senate Office Building

References

External links 
 

1908 establishments in Washington, D.C.
Beaux-Arts architecture in Washington, D.C.
Carrère and Hastings buildings
Congressional office buildings
Government buildings completed in 1908